Sandusky County is a county located in the northwestern part of the U.S. state of Ohio. It is southeast of the Toledo Metropolitan Area. As of the 2020 census, the population was 58,896. Its county seat is Fremont. The county was formed on February 12, 1820, from portions of Huron County. 

The name is derived from the Wyandot word meaning "water",which is also the name of the major river through the county. The Sandusky River runs diagonally northeast through the county to its mouth on Sandusky Bay. The bay opens into Lake Erie.

The Fremont, OH Micropolitan Statistical Area includes all of Sandusky County.

Geography

Adjacent counties
 Ottawa County (north)
 Erie County (east)
 Huron County (southeast)
 Seneca County (south)
 Wood County (west)

Demographics

2000 census
As of the census of 2000, there were 61,792 people, 23,717 households, and 16,957 families living in the county. The population density was 151 people per square mile (58/km2). There were 25,253 housing units at an average density of 62 per square mile (24/km2). The racial makeup of the county was 92.20% White, 2.67% Black or African American, 0.13% Native American, 0.29% Asian, 0.01% Pacific Islander, 3.10% from other races, and 1.61% from two or more races. 6.96% of the population were Hispanic or Latino of any race.

There were 23,717 households, out of which 33.30% had children under the age of 18 living with them, 56.50% were married couples living together, 10.50% had a female householder with no husband present, and 28.50% were non-families. 24.10% of all households were made up of individuals, and 10.60% had someone living alone who was 65 years of age or older. The average household size was 2.56 and the average family size was 3.04.

In the county, the population was spread out, with 26.20% under the age of 18, 8.10% from 18 to 24, 28.30% from 25 to 44, 23.00% from 45 to 64, and 14.50% who were 65 years of age or older. The median age was 37 years. For every 100 females there were 95.90 males. For every 100 females age 18 and over, there were 92.60 males.

The median income for a household in the county was $40,584, and the median income for a family was $47,675. Males had a median income of $35,501 versus $23,964 for females. The per capita income for the county was $19,239. About 5.70% of families and 7.50% of the population were below the poverty line, including 9.10% of those under age 18 and 7.00% of those age 65 or over.

2010 census
As of the 2010 United States Census, there were 60,944 people, 24,182 households, and 16,616 families living in the county. The racial makeup of the county was 91.2% white, 2.8% black or African American, 0.3% Asian, 0.2% American Indian, 2.8% from other races, and 2.6% from two or more races. Those of Hispanic or Latino origin made up 8.9% of the population. In terms of ancestry, 41.9% were German, 12.1% were Irish, 9.5% were English, and 7.1% were American.

Of the 24,182 households, 32.0% had children under the age of 18 living with them, 51.3% were married couples living together, 12.1% had a female householder with no husband present, 31.3% were non-families, and 26.3% of all households were made up of individuals. The average household size was 2.48 and the average family size was 2.97. The median age was 40.4 years.

The median income for a household in the county was $48,056 and the median income for a family was $57,500. Males had a median income of $42,582 versus $31,257 for females. The per capita income for the county was $22,286. About 7.2% of families and 10.9% of the population were below the poverty line, including 15.8% of those under age 18 and 6.5% of those age 65 or over.

Government and politics

Like most of northwestern Ohio, Sandusky County voters have historically supported the Republican Party. It was initially settled by migrants from the Northern Tier of New England and New York, who carried their culture with them. The county has a strong history of supporting Republican presidential candidates as well as local Republican candidates. As a measure of how Republican the county has been, while Franklin D. Roosevelt was en route to a 46-state landslide in 1936, he garnered fewer votes in the county than he had in 1932.

During the 2008 U.S. presidential election, 51% of the voters from Sandusky County supported Democratic candidate Barack Obama. It was the second time since 1964 that the county had supported a Democrat for president, and the second time since 1932 that it had done so with a majority. Obama narrowly carried the county again in 2012 U.S. presidential election with just under 50 percent of the vote. Time magazine listed Sandusky as one of five critical counties in the 2012 election. In 2016 and 2020 the county supported the Republican candidate. 

|}

County officials

Transportation

Major highways
   Interstate 80 (Ohio Turnpike)
   Interstate 90 (Ohio Turnpike)
   U.S. Route 6
   U.S. Route 20
   U.S. Route 23

Other highways

   Ohio State Route 12
   Ohio State Route 18
   Ohio State Route 19
   Ohio State Route 51
   Ohio State Route 53
   Ohio State Route 101
   Ohio State Route 105
   Ohio State Route 300
   Ohio State Route 412
   Ohio State Route 510
   Ohio State Route 523
   Ohio State Route 582
   Ohio State Route 590
   Ohio State Route 600
   Ohio State Route 635

Airports
 Fremont Airport
 Sandusky County Regional Airport

Communities

Cities
 Bellevue
 Clyde
 Fremont (county seat)

Villages

 Burgoon
 Elmore
 Gibsonburg
 Green Springs
 Helena
 Lindsey
 Woodville

Townships

 Ballville
 Green Creek
 Jackson
 Madison
 Rice
 Riley
 Sandusky
 Scott
 Townsend
 Washington
 Woodville
 York

https://web.archive.org/web/20160715023447/http://www.ohiotownships.org/township-websites

Census-designated places

 Ballville
 Hessville
 Stony Prairie
 Vickery
 Whites Landing
 Wightmans Grove

Unincorporated communities
 Colby
 Erlin
 Galetown
 Green Creek
 Havens
 Hessville
 Kingsway
 Millersville
 Rollersville
 Tinney
 Whitmore
 Winters Station
 York

Places of interest
 H. J. Heinz Company ketchup factory (the world's largest)
 Mineral Springs at Green Springs, Ohio
 Rutherford B. Hayes Presidential Center
 Spiegel Grove
 Fremont Speedway

See also
 National Register of Historic Places listings in Sandusky County, Ohio

References

External links
 Sandusky County Convention & Visitors Bureau website
 Sandusky County Government's website
 Sandusky County Economic Development Corporation

 
1820 establishments in Ohio
Populated places established in 1820